Kuldeep Handoo is an Indian coach and former Wushu player, who is the current national chief coach of Wushu team in India. He was honored with the Dronacharya Award, becoming the first person to receive it from  Jammu And Kashmir.

In December 2020, he was nominated by Prime Minister of India as the Ambassador of Fit India Movement. He was born in Srinagar, India and is a Kashmiri Pandit.

Career 
Kuldeep Handoo represented Jammu and Kashmir (state) at various national sports events. He won gold medals at the National Wushu Championship from 1995 to 2005. He had won a gold medal at the National Wushu Championship, which was held in Mizoram in the year 1995. In 1998, Kuldeep Handoo received a job as a sub-inspector in Jammu and Kashmir Police through sports quota. In 2000, he also won a bronze medal in boxing for Jammu and Kashmir Police in All India Police Games. He won a gold medal in 2007 National Games. He won gold medals at the South Asian Wushu Championship in 2000 and 2003. In 2004, he won a bronze medal at the Asian Wushu Championships, held in Myanmar.

In 2006, he turned a coach and was first appointed as the coach of the junior national Wushu team and later in the year 2010, he became national chief coach of Indian Wushu team. Under his guidance, India won on two gold medals in world championships and one in the world cup, 27 silver and 57 bronze medals at various Wushu competitions including Asian Games, World Wushu Championships and World Cup.

Personal life 
Handoo is married to Bhavneet and has a son named, Bhavkul.

Awards and recognition 
 Dronacharya Award, by Government of India, 2020
 Sher-I-Kashmir Sports Award by Government of Jammu and Kashmir
 Jammu and Kashmir Police Medal for meritorious service
 The Parshuram Award, the highest award in the field of sports given by J&K State Sports Council

References 

Living people
Indian wushu practitioners
Indian male martial artists
Indian police officers
People from Jammu and Kashmir
Year of birth missing (living people)
People from Srinagar
Wushu practitioners in India